Port state control (PSC) is an inspection regime for countries to inspect foreign-registered ships in port other than those of the flag state and take action against ships that are not in compliance. Inspectors for PSC are called PSC officers (PSCOs), and are required to investigate compliance with the requirements of international conventions, such as SOLAS, MARPOL, STCW, and the MLC. Inspections can involve checking that the vessel is manned and operated in compliance with applicable international law, and verifying the competency of the ship's master and officers, and the ship's condition and equipment.

History 

In 1978, a number of European countries agreed in The Hague on a memorandum for the audit of labour conditions on board vessels as to whether they were in accordance with the rules of the ILO. After the Amoco Cadiz sank that year, it was decided to also audit safety and pollution practices. To this end, in 1982 fourteen European countries agreed on the Paris Memorandum of Understanding on Port State Control (Paris MoU) to establish port state control. Nowadays 26 European countries and Canada are signatories of Paris MoU. PSC was a reaction to the failure of those flag states especially flag of convenience states that had delegated their survey and certification responsibilities to classification societies.

Modeled on the Paris MOU, several other regional MOUs have been signed, including the Tokyo MOU (Pacific Ocean), Acuerdo Latino or Acuerdo de Viña del Mar (South and Central America), the Caribbean MOU, the Mediterranean MOU, the Indian Ocean MOU, the Abuja MOU (West and Central Atlantic Africa), the Black Sea MOU, and the Riyadh MOU (Persian Gulf).

Inspection and enforcement
The port state control (PSC) makes inspection of ships in port, taken by a port state control officer (PSCO). Annual report of Paris MoU reported that a total of 74,713 deficiencies were recorded during port state control inspections in 2007, which deficiencies resulted in 1,250 detentions that year. Detention of the ship is the last course of action that a PSCO would take upon finding deficiencies aboard the vessel.

Courses of action a PSCO may impose on a ship with deficiencies (in order of ascending gravity) are:
 Deficiencies can be rectified within 14 days for minor infractions.
 Under specific conditions, deficiencies can be rectified when the ship arrives at the next port.
 Deficiencies must be rectified before the ship can depart the port.
 Detention of the ship occurs.

Sanctioning
Port states can also (besides detention etc.) sanction violations with fines. Port states can also in certain cases, for example if a ship violates the 0.5% sulphur limit of MARPOL Annex VI, assert jurisdiction for such violations which occur on the high seas. The extraterritorial jurisdictional basis for such enforcement and sanctioning is found within the special provisions of part XII of the United Nations Convention on the Law of the Sea (UNCLOS).

References

External links
 Paris MoU on Port State Control (official website)
 Port State Control (7 July 2009 archive of International Maritime Organization website)

Ports and harbours
Law of the sea
International law
Ship registration